There are 291 properties and historic districts on the National Register of Historic Places in Worcester, Massachusetts.  Of these, 82 are west of I-190 and the north-south section of I-290 and south of Massachusetts Route 122, and are listed below.  One listing, the Blackstone Canal Historic District, overlaps into other parts of the city.

The locations of National Register properties and districts (at least for all showing latitude and longitude coordinates below) may be seen in an online map by clicking on "Map of all coordinates".

Current listings

|}

See also
National Register of Historic Places listings in Worcester, Massachusetts
National Register of Historic Places listings in northwestern Worcester, Massachusetts
National Register of Historic Places listings in eastern Worcester, Massachusetts
National Register of Historic Places listings in Worcester County, Massachusetts

References

History of Worcester, Massachusetts
NRHP Southwest
South